Glenn Molloy (born 13 September 1971) is a former Australian rules footballer who played with Melbourne in the Australian Football League (AFL).

Molloy is the son of 67-game Melbourne player Graham Molloy and was drafted under the father-son rule. A halfback, he made 20 appearances for Melbourne over the course of 4 seasons, which included a semi-final in 1994. He returned to his original club Norwood in 1997 and was a member of a premiership team that year.

References

1971 births
Australian rules footballers from South Australia
Melbourne Football Club players
Norwood Football Club players
Living people